is a railway station located in Higashi-1-jō-Minami-6-chōme (東一条南6丁目), Nayoro, Hokkaidō, Japan. It is operated by the Hokkaido Railway Company.

Lines served
JR Hokkaidō
Sōya Main Line

Adjacent stations

External links
Ekikara Time Table - JR Nayoro Station (Japanese)

Railway stations in Hokkaido Prefecture
Railway stations in Japan opened in 1903